.nai is a proposed generic top-level domain (gTLD) for Native, Aboriginal & Indigenous communities of the Americas. This proposal is the successor to the 1999 .naa proposal to ICANN for "a gTLD jurisdictionally scoped to North America and the territories, trusts and treaty dependencies of the United States and Canada, and with a policy model of registry delegation to, and registry operation by, the Indigenous Nations and Peoples of North America."

Initially, a work product of the "T", the proposal was presented to the "Digital Council Fires: A Native American Telecommunications Conference". The conference was held on May 13–16, 1999 in Albuquerque, New Mexico, and was organized by the National Indian Telecommunications Institute (NITI), a private non-profit organization that employs advanced technology to serve American Indians, Alaskan Natives, and Native Hawaiians in the areas of education, economic development, language, and cultural preservation, tribal policy issues, and self-determination.

A related effort, also a work product of the Tribal Law mailing list, was an ICANN VI-B(3)(b)(7) Constituency Application for an Indigenous Intellectual Property Constituency. 

The geographic scope of the .nai proposal is larger than the explicit scope of the original .naa proposal, and it includes the Americas, Aotearoa, and Indigenous Australians, though the extension was implicit in the original.

The contractual form of the .nai proposal will be "community-based" rather than "sponsored", reflecting changes in ICANN's conception of gTLDs.

The string "nai" exists in ISO 639-2 and is allocated to North American Indian languages. Similarly, the string "sai" exists in ISO 639-2 and is allocated to South American Indian languages, as is the string "aus" for Australian languages.

See also 
 .cat
 .eus
 .gal
 .bzh
 .scot

References

External links
Project Website

N